Xiaodong Wang (born 1963) is a Chinese biochemist best known for his work with cytochrome c. His laboratory developed an in vitro assay for the activation of the apoptosis related proteinase Caspase-3.  This allowed the biochemical purification of a complex of Cytochrome c, Caspase-9 and the Apoptotic Protease Activating factor-1 (APAF1).  These components are essential for forming a ternary complex called the apoptosome that activates Caspase-3 downstream of the intracellular or mitochondrial pathway of apoptosis.

He was awarded the 2006 Shaw Prize in Life Science and Medicine.

Wang is a member of United States National Academy of Sciences and the Howard Hughes Medical Institute. Currently he is the director of the National Institute of Biological Sciences, Beijing.

Honors & awards
 2020, King Faisal International Prize in Medicine.
 2007, Richard Lounsbery Award, from the National Academy of Sciences, USA
 2006, Shaw Prize, from the Shaw Foundation
 2004, NAS Award in Molecular Biology
 2003, Hackerman Award, from the Welch Foundation
 2001, Paul Marks Prize, from the Memorial Sloan-Kettering Cancer Center
 2000, Eli Lilly Award in Biological Chemistry, from American Chemical Society

References

1963 births
Living people
American biochemists
Beijing Normal University alumni
Chinese emigrants to the United States
Members of the United States National Academy of Sciences
Foreign members of the Chinese Academy of Sciences
Chinese biochemists
People from Xinxiang
Chemists from Henan
Educators from Henan
University of Texas Southwestern Medical Center faculty
Biologists from Henan
Richard-Lounsbery Award laureates
Members of the European Molecular Biology Organization